The East Lyn is a river which rises high in Exmoor, in the English county of Somerset. It flows through the East Lyn Valley in Devon.

Watercourse
The river is formed as the Upper East Lyn at Malmsmead from two minor tributaries, the Oare Water and Badgworthy Water. It flows for several miles, past Brendon and makes confluence with Hoar Oak Water at Watersmeet, where Watersmeet House is situated. The river then passes through a narrow gorge section, before flowing downstream for a further  until the river meets with the West Lyn River and flows into the Bristol Channel at Lynmouth.

History
The Lynmouth Disaster occurred on the East Lyn river due to rocks and fallen trees having been washed into the West Lyn river. These formed a log jam near Watersmeet, forming a landslide dam. When the pressure behind the dam increased to uncontrollable levels, the water broke out of the dam, and rushed down the East Lyn (via the convergence of the rivers) into Lynmouth, obliterating houses and ultimately resulting in 34 deaths. Boulders from the incident can still be seen today along the banks of the East Lyn towards Lynmouth.

Recreation

Angling
Angling interests especially in the summer are targeted towards the salmon which migrate up the river to spawn. There is also trout fishing.

Walking
It is popular for walkers with the Two Moors Way near to much of the river.

Whitewater kayaking
Whitewater kayakers frequently run this river in the winter when seeking a challenging Grade 4 paddle.

References

External links
 National Trust website on the East Lyn river

Exmoor
Rivers of Somerset
Lynton and Lynmouth
 

pl:Lyn